Adrian Mierzejewski (born 6 November 1986) is a Polish professional footballer who plays as a midfielder for Chinese Super League club Henan Songshan Longmen.

Club career

Early career
Born in Olsztyn, Mierzejewski began his career at local side Tempo 25 Olsztyn, then he moved to Naki Olsztyn.

On 31 May 2003, aged 16, he made his II liga debut for Stomil Olsztyn in a game against Świt Nowy Dwór Mazowiecki, coming on as a substitute for Marcin Kubsik in 79th minute. He ended the 2002–03 season having made three league appearances, all as a substitute. After the season, he returned to Naki Olsztyn.

Wisła Płock
In 2004 Mierzejewski signed a five-year contract with Wisła Płock for a fee of 15 000 złotys. He made his Ekstraklasa debut on 15 May 2004 in a match against Dyskobolia Grodzisk Wielkopolski, when he came on as a substitution for Dariusz Romuzga 86th. He made his first league on start on 8 June 2004 in a 1–1 draw with GKS Katowice. Mierzejewski played 45 minutes and was replaced by Klaudiusz Ząbecki. He ended the 2003–04 season with three league appearances.

On 10 November 2004 he scored his first goal for Wisła in a 5–1 win over Kujawiak Włocławek in the Polish Cup. On 1 May 2005 Mierzejewski scored his first Ekstraklasa goal in a game against Górnik Łęczna which Wisła lost 2–3. Mierzejewski ended the 2004–05 season with 18 appearances and four goals in all competitions.

On 11 August 2005 he made his debut in European competition playing in a UEFA Cup second qualifying round match against Grasshopper. Mierzejewski ended the 2005–06 season with 27 appearances and two goals in all competitions. He also won the Polish Cup with Wisła. However, he didn't play in the final.

After six appearances for Wisła in the 2006–07 season, on 23 February 2007 he was loaned for six months to Zagłębie Sosnowiec. He made his debut for Zagłębie on 10 March in a league game against Piast Gliwice and a month later in a 3–0 victory over Kmita Zabierzów he scored his first goal for a new club. He ended the season with 20 appearances and one goal in all competitions. Zagłębie was promoted to Ekstraklasa, but Wisła was relegated.

In the 2007–08 season Mierzejewski made 19 appearances and scored two goals in all competitions. In the autumn round of the following season he scored eight goals in 20 matches including a hat-trick in an 8–0 victory over ŁKS Łomża in the Polish Cup.

Polonia Warsaw
On 22 December 2008 Mierzejewski signed a three-year contract with Polonia Warsaw. He made his debut for Polonia on 27 February 2009 in the derby match against Legia Warsaw (0–0). In the following match, on 7 March, he scored his first goal, in an away game against Wisła Kraków which Polonia lost 1–2. Mierzejewski ended the 2008–09 season with 18 appearances and one goal for Polonia in all competitions. Also, he made one appearance for the Młoda Ekstraklasa team.

On 23 July 2009 he scored his first goal in a European competition in a 4–0 victory over Juveness/Dogana in the  second qualifying round of the 2009–10 UEFA Europa League. In the 2009–10 season he was a first-team player. Overall, he made 36 appearances and scored three goals in this season. On 18 August 2010 he extended his contract with Polonia to 2013.

During his time at Polonia he emerged on the national stage winning the "Ekstraklasa player of the year award" in the 2010–11 season in which he also captained Polonia's team.

Trabzonspor

He signed a 5-year contract with Trabzonspor on 16 June 2011. Trabzonspor paid 5.25 million euros for him, an all-time record for an Ekstraklasa player at that time.

Al Nassr FC
On 11 June 2014, Al-Nassr announced on their Twitter account the signing of Adrian Mierzejewski. However, the player didn't complete his transfer at that time as he was during the negotiations process with the Saudi Arabian team. It became official on 20 June 2014, when Mierzejewski signed a three-year contract with Al-Nassr for a €3.2 million fee.

Mierzejewski debuted in Saudi Super Cup match against Al Shabab, on 7 August 2014. He gave assist to Mohammad Al-Sahlawi who scored the first goal in Saudi Super Cup. He scored his first goal in league against Najran SC on 15 August 2014. Then he scored  twice against Al Raed in 2nd week. On 13 September 2014, he scored a goal for Al-Nassr in MatchDay 4 against former champion Al Fateh.

In 2015 AFC Champions League, he scored his 1st goal against Iranian side Persepolis. With Al-Nassr, he played in all the six group stage matches, scoring just 2 goals and failed to qualify for the Round of 16.

On 10 May 2015, Adrian helped Al-Nassr win their 2nd consecutive league title. He played 25 games in 2014–15 Saudi Professional League, scoring 8 goals. He is the 2nd top scorer of Al-Nassr in league.

Sydney FC

On 12 August 2017, Mierzejewski signed a three-year deal with A-League champions Sydney FC.

Mierzejewski made his debut and scored his first goal for Sydney FC in the 3–0 2017 FFA Cup win over Bankstown Berries, dispatching a penalty in 90+1. The Pole scored his first league goal from the penalty spot as well, in a 2–0 win against Perth Glory at Allianz Stadium.

In the 2017 FFA Cup Final, Mierzejewski won the Mark Viduka Medal for Man of the Match, as the Sky Blues beat Adelaide United 2–1 AET. This good form continued, with Mierzejewski scoring 2 goals for Sydney in the Sydney Derby record 5–0 win. He was instrumental to the game, being named the Man of the Match.
On 29 April 2017, Mierzejewski has taken out the 2017/18 Johnny Warren medal for best player in the A-League finished 11 points clear of Dimitri Petratos and Leroy George.

Changchun Yatai
On 8 July 2018, Mierzejewski transferred to Chinese Super League side Changchun Yatai.

Chongqing Lifan
On 13 February 2019, Mierzejewski transferred to fellow Super League side Chongqing Lifan.

International career
Mierzejewski played for U18, U19, U20 and U21 national teams.

On 29 May 2010 he debuted for the national team of Poland in a friendly match against Finland.

On 5 June 2011 he scored his first goal for the national team, giving his team a 1–0 lead in a friendly match against Argentina. The match ended with a 2–1 victory for Poland.

Career statistics

Club

1 All appearances in Ekstraklasa Cup.
2 Three appearances in Saudi Crown Prince Cup and three appearances and one goal in King Cup.
3 All appearances in Saudi Super Cup.
4 Two appearances and on goal in Saudi Crown Prince Cup and three appearances in King Cup.

International goals
Scores and results list Poland's goal tally first.

Personal life
On 11 June 2011 Mierzejewski married his girlfriend Małgorzata. The couple started dating when they were both attending V Liceum Ogólnokształcące in Olsztyn.

Honours

Club
 Al-Nassr
 Saudi Professional League: 2014–15

Sydney FC
A-League Premiership: 2017–18
FFA Cup: 2017

Individual
Saudi Professional League Player of the Month: August 2014
Mark Viduka Medal: 2017
A-League Player of the Month: December 2017, February 2018
Johnny Warren Medal: 2017–18
Alex Tobin Medal: 2017–18
A-League Team of the Season: 2017–18

References

External links

 
 
 
 

1986 births
Living people
Sportspeople from Olsztyn
Polish footballers
Poland international footballers
Poland youth international footballers
Poland under-21 international footballers
Polish expatriate footballers
Association football midfielders
OKS Stomil Olsztyn players
Polonia Warsaw players
Wisła Płock players
Zagłębie Sosnowiec players
Trabzonspor footballers
Al Nassr FC players
Sharjah FC players
Sydney FC players
Changchun Yatai F.C. players
Chongqing Liangjiang Athletic F.C. players
Guangzhou City F.C. players
Shanghai Shenhua F.C. players
Henan Songshan Longmen F.C. players
Ekstraklasa players
I liga players
Süper Lig players
Saudi Professional League players
UAE Pro League players
A-League Men players
Chinese Super League players
UEFA Euro 2012 players
Expatriate footballers in Turkey
Expatriate footballers in Saudi Arabia
Expatriate footballers in the United Arab Emirates
Expatriate soccer players in Australia
Expatriate footballers in China
Polish expatriate sportspeople in Turkey
Polish expatriate sportspeople in Saudi Arabia
Polish expatriate sportspeople in the United Arab Emirates
Polish expatriate sportspeople in Australia
Polish expatriate sportspeople in China